Sean Ingle is a British sports journalist. He is currently the chief sports reporter and columnist for The Guardian and The Observer. He was previously the newspaper's athletics correspondent and online sports editor.

Early life and education
Ingle was born in Luton, UK. He was educated at Luton Sixth Form College before graduating from the University of Sheffield with a first-class degree in Political Science and Government in 1997.

Career
Ingle began his career in journalism as a sports writer for EMAP in 1998. He joined The Guardian a year and a half later in the same capacity until he was promoted to deputy sports editor and then sports editor of the website in 2004. He also launched the popular podcast Football Weekly, which was nominated for a Sony award.

Ingle was posted to Germany to cover the 2006 World Cup for The Guardian. In Baden-Baden, while at a restaurant with colleague Jonathan Wilson, he was bitten on the buttocks by a German Shepherd; the dog bit him so hard that he bled.

He remained as the sports editor of the website until after the 2012 Olympics in London, when he was named a senior sports writer and Athletics Correspondent, as he returned to full-time reporting duties for The Guardian, Observer and the website. He also began writing a weekly column on issues in sport.

Ingle has broken several high-profile stories, including the revelation that four-time Tour de France winner Chris Froome failed a doping test during the Vuelta a España road race in September 2017. His report, co-authored with Martha Kelner, won Scoop of the Year at the 2017 British Sports Journalism Awards.

He was named Specialist Correspondent of the Year at the 2016 and 2017 British Sports Journalism Awards.

References

External links 
Sean Ingle on Twitter

Year of birth missing (living people)
Living people
The Guardian journalists
British sports journalists
British podcasters
People from Luton
English people of Irish descent
Alumni of the University of Sheffield